Subash Ghisingh was an Indian politician who was the leader of Gorkha National Liberation Front (GNLF), which he founded in 1980. He was the chairman of the Darjeeling Gorkha Hill Council in West Bengal, India from 1988 to 2008. He spearheaded the Gorkhaland movement in the 1980s.

The Gorkhaland movement grew from the demand of Gorkhas living in Darjeeling District of West Bengal for a separate state. The Gorkhaland National Liberation Front led the movement, which disrupted the district with massive violence between 1986 and 1988, leading to the deaths of many who were involved. The issue was resolved, at least temporarily, in 1988 with the establishment of the Darjeeling Gorkha Hill Council within West Bengal.

After a prolonged illness, Subhash Ghisingh died on 29 January 2015 at Ganga Ram Hospital in New Delhi. The hospital authorities released a statement stating that Subhash Ghisingh was suffering from pneumonia and liver cancer. Ghisingh's son Mohan Ghisingh was named the new party chief by the GNLF.

Statehood demand
In 1986, the Gorkhaland National Liberation Front under the leadership of Subhash Ghisingh demanded a separate state of Gorkhaland within India. This statehood movement turned violent and was severely repressed by the West Bengal government. The disturbances almost totally shut down the Darjeeling district's economic mainstays of tea and tourism. The Left Front government of West Bengal, which earlier had supported some form of autonomy, now opposed it as "antinational". The state government claimed that Darjeeling district was no worse off than the state in general and was richer than many districts. However, GNLF spoke of discrimination from the West Bengal administration towards the Gorkhas.

After two years of violent agitation and the loss of at least 1200 lives, the government of West Bengal and the central government of India agreed on granting a semi-autonomous administrative body to Darjeeling hills. In July 1988, the GNLF gave up its demand for a separate state, and in August 1988, the Darjeeling Gorkha Hill Council came into being. Ghisingh became its chairman after winning the first council elections. The council had authority over some economic development programmes, tourism and culture. Ghisingh remained the chairman of the DGHC for 20 years with his GNLF party winning the DGHC elections three times.

Sixth Schedule and exile
The fourth DGHC elections were due in 2004. However, the government decided not to hold elections and instead made Subhash Ghisingh the sole caretaker of the DGHC till a Sixth Schedule tribal council was established in the Darjeeling hills. Most of the other political parties and organisations opposed the setting up of a Sixth Schedule tribal council as there was only a minority tribal population in the DGHC area. Resentment among the former councillors of DGHC also grew rapidly. Among them, Bimal Gurung, once the trusted aide of Ghisingh, decided to break away from the GNLF. Riding on a mass support for Prashant Tamang, an Indian Idol candidate from Darjeeling in 2007, Bimal quickly capitalised on the public support he received for supporting Prashant, and was able to overthrow Ghisingh from the seat of power. Ghisingh resigned from the chairmanship of the DGHC in March 2008 and shifted residence to Jalpaiguri. GNLF lost most of its support and cadres to Gorkha Janmukti Morcha, a new party headed by Bimal Gurung.

West Bengal assembly elections 2011 and return from exile
After lying in political hibernation for three years, Subhash Ghisingh returned to Darjeeling on 8 April 2011 ahead of the West Bengal assembly elections. His party contested the state assembly elections held on 18 April 2011 from three constituencies in the Darjeeling hills but lost all the three seats that it had won in the earlier election. Ghisingh left the Darjeeling hills again on 16 May 2011 on yet another political hibernation. He later returned to Darjeeling ahead of the Lok Sabha elections in 2014 but remained politically inactive due to his poor health.

References

1936 births
University of North Bengal alumni
2015 deaths
People from Darjeeling district
West Bengal politicians
Indian Gorkhas
Politics of Darjeeling district
Deaths from cancer in India
Deaths from liver cancer
Tamang people